Nottingham General Cemetery is a place of burial in Nottingham, England which is Grade II listed.

History
The Nottingham General Cemetery Company received Royal Assent for their Act of Parliament on 19 May 1836.

In 1837–40, the cemetery gatehouse with almshouses was constructed to the designs of the architect Samuel Sutton Rawlinson at the top of Sion Hill, now Canning Circus. The wrought iron gates were made by Falconer and Company of Derby. Rawlinson also provided two mortuary chapels, one for Anglicans in 1840, and the other for dissenters in ca. 1850.

The laying out of the cemetery was completed by 1838 with a single grave available for 7s 6d, a private grave the property of the purchaser in perpetuity from £2. 2sand upwards, and a brick grave or vault from £10. 10s and upwards.

In 1923 the Medical Officer of Health expressed concern about the future of the cemetery and a bill was taken to Parliament to prevent new burials except in existing family plots.

After the Second World War, the cemetery company went into liquidation, and after a period of ownership by the Crown, the freehold passed to Nottingham City Council in 1956. The mortuary chapels were both in a state of disrepair and were demolished in 1958.

War graves
The cemetery contains the war graves of 336 Commonwealth service personnel and one Belgian war grave from World War I, and of 10 from World War II. Most of the dead were from wartime military hospitals in the city. Over 100 of the graves from the first war are in a war graves plot where an adjoining screen wall lists the names. The Commonwealth War Graves Commission continue to maintain the graves.

Notable interments
 William Booker (architect) 1863
Ann Taylor (poet) 1866
Samuel Morley (VC) 1888
Samuel Cox (minister) 1893
Bell Taylor surgeon 1909 
Francis Marshall Ward singer 1914
William Brandreth Savidge architect 1939
Henry Sulley architect 1940

References

1836 establishments in England
Anglican cemeteries in the United Kingdom
Cemeteries in England
Grade II listed buildings in Nottinghamshire
Nottingham
Parks and open spaces in Nottinghamshire